Bebington and Ellesmere Port was a parliamentary constituency  in the United Kingdom, which returned one Member of Parliament (MP) to the House of Commons of the Parliament of the United Kingdom, elected by the first past the post system. It existed from Feb 1974 to 1983.

The constituency was centred on the towns of Bebington and Ellesmere Port on the Wirral Peninsula in England.

History 
Created for the February 1974 election, it ceased to exist with the implementation of the boundary changes brought in for the 1983 general election.

Boundaries
The Boroughs of Bebington and Ellesmere Port.

Bebington was previously part of the former constituency of Bebington, and Ellesmere Port was transferred from the Wirral constituency.

From major local government boundary changes on 1 April 1974 until the constituency was abolished for the 1983 general election, Ellesmere Port was part of the new Borough of Ellesmere Port and Neston in Cheshire whilst Bebington comprised part of the Metropolitan Borough of Wirral in Merseyside, but its boundaries remained unchanged.

On abolition in 1983, Bebington became part of the new constituency of Wirral South and Ellesmere Port formed part of the new constituency of Ellesmere Port and Neston.

Members of Parliament

Results

See also 
Bebington (UK Parliament constituency)
Ellesmere Port and Neston (UK Parliament constituency)
History of parliamentary constituencies and boundaries in Cheshire

References

Election results, 1950 - 1979

Parliamentary constituencies in North West England (historic)
Constituencies of the Parliament of the United Kingdom established in 1974
Constituencies of the Parliament of the United Kingdom disestablished in 1983
Ellesmere Port